Peter, son of Töre (executed in 1213) was a Hungarian lord, who served as judge royal in 1198, during the reign of King Emeric.

Peter led a group of Hungarian magnates, who assassinated Queen Gertrude on 28 September 1213.

Career
Peter was the son of Töre (also Turoy, Turwey or Toraj). According to non-authentic charters, he served as ispán of Pozsony County from 1193 to 1195 during the late reign of King Béla III. He was mentioned as ispán of Bihar County in 1197. King Emeric appointed him Judge royal in the following year, replacing Esau. Beside that he also functioned as ispán of Szolnok County. By 1199, he lost both dignities replacing by Mika Ják and Ampud (son of Palatine Ampud) respectively.

His lands were laying in Syrmia and south of Bács County. The centre of his estates was Pétervárad – today Petrovaradin, part of the agglomeration of Novi Sad, Serbia – which was named after him. In 1201, he held the position of ispán of Sopron County.

Until 1207, Peter disappeared from contemporary sources, it is presumable that he supported the rebellious Duke Andrew against King Emeric, thus unable to hold any political offices in the royal court. Following Andrew's accession to the throne in 1205, Peter belonged to the Queen's royal household. Between 1207 and 1210, he served as Judge royal for Queen Gertrude, after that he was replaced by Bánk Bár-Kalán in that position. In addition, Peter also functioned as ispán of Szolnok County for the second time (1207) and ispán of Csanád County from 1207 until his death. Finally he also held the office of ispán of Bács County between 1210 and 1212. In 1211, Peter participated in the royal campaign against the Principality of Halych.

Assassination of Queen Gertrude

When Andrew II left Hungary for a new campaign against Halych, a group of Hungarian lords, taking advantage of the King's absence, captured and murdered Queen Gertrude and many of her courtiers in the Pilis Hills on 28 September 1213. Gertrude's body was torn to pieces, while her brother Berthold, the Archbishop of Kalocsa and Leopold VI, Duke of Austria narrowly escaped with their lives. Gertrude was buried in the Pilis Abbey. According to the contemporary reports, Peter personally slaughtered the Queen, while Palatine Bánk Bár-Kalán, the Kacsics brothers (Simon and Michael) and other lords were also involved in the conspiracy.

The motivation of the murderers is uncertain. According to later tradition, Queen Gertrude's brother (Berthold) raped Bánk's wife. Bánk killed the Queen because he felt she had encouraged her brother. This version appeared in the Chronicon rhythmicum Austriacum around 1270, which was repeated by the 14th-century Hungarian chronicles (Chronica Hungarorum, Annales Posonienses etc.). Formerly linguist János Horváth argued the chroniclers in fact referred to the coeval Felician Záh's assassination attempt (1330) against Charles I of Hungary, when describing Gertrude's death. József Katona's Bánk bán (which was set to music by Ferenc Erkel), where Peter appears as Ban Petúr, also preserved and spread this version. Further records from the 15th century, based on De fundatoribus monasterii Diessensis, says Gertrude was innocently murdered, because she had not known Berthold's intention and crime.

It is much more likely that the Hungarian lords led by Peter, who were aggrieved at Queen Gertrude's favoritism towards her German entourage, feared to permanently lose their court positions and influence. Formerly, Gertrude's two brothers, Ekbert, Bishop of Bamberg, and Henry II, Margrave of Istria, fled to Hungary in 1208 after they were accused of participating in the murder of Philip, King of the Germans. Berthold of Kalocsa (since 1206) was also appointed Ban of Slavonia in 1209 and later Voivode of Transylvania in 1212 by the dismissals of Bánk Bár-Kalán and Michael Kacsics respectively. Andrew's generosity towards his wife's German relatives and courtiers obviously discontented the local lords. The unidentified author of the Gesta Hungarorum also referred to the Germans from the Holy Roman Empire when he sarcastically mentioned that " the Romans gaze on the goods of Hungary." Some sources also mention John, Archbishop of Esztergom's famous letter (Reginam occidere). Historian Tamás Körmendi considered Peter's personal motivation behind the murder.

Execution
When Andrew II heard the news of his wife's murder, he interrupted the campaign in Halych and returned to home. He ordered the execution of the murderer, Peter, son of Töre, who was impaled in the autumn of 1213 and his lands were also confiscated. According to the continuation of Magnus von Reichersberg's chronicle, Peter was executed along with his wife and entire family. However, Peter's accomplices, including Palatine Bánk, did not receive severe punishments, due to the current political situation and Andrew's power instability. Bánk also held several influential positions even after the assassination.

Only Duke Béla, son of Andrew and Gertrude, took revenge after he was nominated Duke of Transylvania and started to revise his father's policy. In 1228, he confiscated the estates of Bánk and the Kacsics brothers, who had plotted against his mother. Tamás Körmendi considered they were all became victims of power intrigues and political purge, and accused of conspiracy purely out of political reasons. According to a royal charter issued in 1237, Béla IV, now as king, donated Peter's former lands to the newly founded the Cistercian Bélakút Abbey, which belonged to the Archdiocese of Kalocsa.

References

Sources
 Engel, Pál (2001). The Realm of St Stephen: A History of Medieval Hungary, 895-1526. I.B. Tauris Publishers. .
  Körmendi, Tamás (2009a): A Gertrúd királyné elleni merénylet a magyar gestaszerkesztményben ("The Murderous Attack against Queen Gertrudis according to the Hungarian Gestas"). In: Körmendi, Tamás – Thoroczkay, Gábor (ed.): Auxilium historiae. Tanulmányok a hetvenesztendős Bertényi Iván tiszteletére, Eötvös Loránd University, Budapest. pp. 195–205.
  Körmendi, Tamás (2009b): A Gertrúd királyné elleni merénylet a külhoni elbeszélő forrásokban ("The Murderous Attack against Queen Gertrudis according to the Foreign Narrative Sources"). Történelmi Szemle Vol. 51. pp. 155–193.
  Körmendi, Tamás (2014): A Gertrúd királyné elleni merénylet körülményei ("The Circumstances of the Murder of Queen Gertrude"). In: Majorossy, Judit (ed.): Egy történelmi gyilkosság margójára. Merániai Gertrúd emlékezete, 1213–2013, Ferenczy Museum, Szentendre. pp. 95–124.
  Markó, László (2006): A magyar állam főméltóságai Szent Istvántól napjainkig – Életrajzi Lexikon ("The High Officers of the Hungarian State from Saint Stephen to the Present Days – A Biographical Encyclopedia") (2nd edition); Helikon Kiadó Kft., Budapest. .
  Zsoldos, Attila (2011). Magyarország világi archontológiája, 1000–1301 ("Secular Archontology of Hungary, 1000–1301"). História, MTA Történettudományi Intézete. Budapest. 

1213 deaths
Executed Hungarian people
Hungarian assassins
Judges royal
People executed by Hungary
People executed by impalement
Executed assassins
12th-century Hungarian people
13th-century Hungarian people